Medan State University or UNIMED is a public university located in the city of Medan in North Sumatra region, Indonesia.

History

Initially known as the Teachers Training College, Medan State University (MSU) was established in 1956. It is one of the oldest universities in the country with rich history in Medan. On 27 August 1957, the college was absorbed into the University of North Sumatra as a result it became the university's Faculty for Teachers Training and Education.

As a result of the establishment of a branch campus of the Institute for Teachers Training and Education in Medan on 23 June 1963, the faculty gained autonomy ( or IKIP). In 1964, the Physical Education faculty was separated from the institute and was established as the Sports Institute only to be reintegrated back into IKIP Medan system in 1977.

On October 7, 1999, IKIP Medan received university status. It was re-opened as Medan State University in February 2000, upon granting and receiving the university status.

Academics

State University of Medan provides programmes ranging from undergraduate diplomas to postgraduate doctorates from the following faculties:

Undergraduate programs

Postgraduate programs

Listed below are the number of postgraduate programs available at the university, including:

See also
 List of universities in Indonesia
 Medan

References

External links
 Official website of UNIMED (In English and Indonesian)

 
Universities in Medan
M
Indonesian state universities
Educational institutions established in 1956
1956 establishments in Indonesia